Sir John Shadworth, also Chadworth (died between January 7, 1430, and October 6, 1430) was an English politician, businessman, alderman and Sheriff of the City of London who served as Lord Mayor of London from 1401 to 1402.

Origins 
The first reference to Shadworth occurred in May 1371 where he is recognised as an executor of a man named Thomas Bushey. Shadworth also had served an apprenticeship with Mercer Thomas Cornerth. Four years later, Shadworth (along with others), was accused by fishmonger Walter Sibille of conducting an armed raid upon his property in Great Yarmouth. A royal commission was formed to investigate this; however, this seems to have had little consequence as in June 1382 Shadworth was on decent terms with Sibille as they could act as joint auditors of certain mercantile accounts.

Later career and death
Shadworth died between January 7 and October 6, 1430. He never married or had any children, and left most of his large estate for pious and charitable works. He was buried in a vault in the chancel of St Mildred, Bread Street. Many remains in the church were disinterred and moved to Brookwood Cemetery in 1898.

See also 
 List of sheriffs of London
 List of lord mayors of London
 Court of Husting

References 

Lord mayors of London
Sheriffs of the City of London
Politicians from London
Businesspeople from London
1430 deaths
15th-century lord mayors of London
14th-century English businesspeople
15th-century English businesspeople
14th-century English politicians
15th-century English politicians
Aldermen of the City of London